Histone H3.1t is a protein that in humans is encoded by the HIST3H3 gene.

Histones are basic nuclear proteins that are responsible for the nucleosome structure of the chromosomal fiber in eukaryotes. Nucleosomes consist of approximately 146 bp of DNA wrapped around a histone octamer composed of pairs of each of the four core histones (H2A, H2B, H3, and H4). The chromatin fiber is further compacted through the interaction of a linker histone, H1, with the DNA between the nucleosomes to form higher order chromatin structures. This gene is intronless and encodes a member of the histone H3 family. Transcripts from this gene lack polyA tails; instead, they contain a palindromic termination element. This gene is located separately from the other H3 genes that are in the histone gene cluster on chromosome 6p22-p21.3.

References

Further reading